The individual dressage in equestrian at the 2018 Asian Games was held at the Jakarta International Equestrian Park from 20 to 23 August 2018.

Schedule
All times are Western Indonesia Time (UTC+07:00)

Results
Legend
EL — Eliminated

Prix St-Georges

Intermediate I

Intermediate I freestyle

References

External links
Equestrian at the 2018 Asian Games

Individual dressage